Vermont Information Processing, Inc. (VIP) is a 100% employee owned small business that provides technology solutions to all three tiers of the beverage industry. VIP offers an enterprise level Route Accounting System and other applications for beer distributors and soft drink bottlers. They also provide data collections, sales execution, and analytics tools for beverage suppliers.

History
Vermont Information Processing was founded in 1972 by Howard Aiken. The company purchased third shift computer time from a local bus company and focused on providing sales analysis services to distributors of soft drinks, wine, and beer. Distributors mailed retailer invoices to VIP where they were keyed into a mainframe computer for processing. The sales analysis reports were returned to the distributors via United States Postal Service mail.

The transition from a service provider to a software development firm started in 1975 with the advent of affordable IBM mini computers for distributors. The original VIP software applications had an emphasis on route accounting functions as well as the backbone sales analysis suite.

The mainstream use of handheld computers started in 1978 with beverage sales reps using the devices to enter retail orders in the field and transmit them to the minicomputers.  In subsequent years, handheld computers were heavily used by warehouse and delivery personnel.

In 1979, VIP grew to 15 employees, and moved to new headquarters in Colchester, Vermont. The business expanded to over 30 people by 1991 and the company built and occupied a 32,000 square foot office building. 

2001 was a pivotal year for VIP. The company branched from its solid base in distributor software and started offering services for beverage suppliers. The VIP employee stock ownership plan (ESOP) also started in 2001 with 30% of the company being owned by the employees. 

In 2007, VIP implemented regression testing to expedite the testing of new features and versions.

VIP, now 100% employee owned, counts over 600 distributors and 1,200 suppliers as customers who use its software suite. The company has offices in Trevose, PA, Bend, OR, Pleasant Hill, MO, Chicago, IL, and Holland, MI in addition to the headquarters in Colchester, VT.

Acquisitions 

 In 2003, VIP acquired MicroVane of Kalamazoo, MI and the dBEV route accounting system. VIP continues to maintain and support the dBEV system.
 In 2005, VIP acquired Wholesaler Computer Systems (WCS) of St. Louis, MO and their route accounting system.
 In 2015, VIP acquired BDN Collections from Nielsen, increasing their involvement with wine and spirits suppliers.
 In 2017, VIP acquired TradePulse of Novato, CA and their data collections for wine suppliers.
 In 2020, VIP acquired Vistaar’s US Beverage Alcohol business, and entered into a long term partnership.
 In 2022, VIP acquired Data Consultants, Inc. (DCI) and BizStride route planning consulting services.
 In 2022, VIP acquired eoStar of Holland, MI and their competitive route accounting system. VIP continues to maintain and support the eoStar system.

Route Accounting Software
The core of VIP's software solutions for distributors and bottlers is the Route Accounting System (VIP Beverage). Route accounting software is used by companies to keep track of product as it moves through the distribution process from the time it is received from the supplier to the time it is delivered to the retailer.

Warehouse Management System
VIP has a Warehouse Management System, WMS, that incorporates handheld technology that can transmit information about inventory movements and transactions in real-time to the Route Accounting Software. Users use apps on a tablet or smartphone to track and move inventory as well as to diagram trucks, and pick and load orders.

Day care
VIP has had an on-site daycare facility providing education services to children of employees of the Colchester office since 1991.

Users Conference
VIP holds a Users Conference annually in the fall and it is attended by VIP Route Accounting System distributor and bottler customers, business partners, hardware vendors, and other interested parties. VIP also hosts workshops and conferences for beverage suppliers.

VIP Culture 
VIP's headquarters in Colchester, VT offers employees an on-site cafe, child care center, health clinic, two fitness centers, on-site group fitness classes, basketball, street hockey, and pickleball courts. There are also community gardens, group walks, book club, group wellness challenges, and numerous company events & parties.

Supporting the Community 
VIP employees regularly participate in fundraisers and other community events like the Harpoon Point to Point Race, Special Olympics Vermont Penguin Plunge, Kelly Brush Bike Ride, Vermont Dragon Boat Festival, Spectrum Sleep Out, Switchback’s Ride for the Lake, 5K Doggie Fun Run, UVM Children’s Hospital Extra Life Event, Vermont Heart Walk, Vermont Foodbank Food Drive, and many more.

References

Companies based in Vermont
Software companies of the United States